The 1978 United States House of Representatives elections was an election for the United States House of Representatives on November 7, 1978, to elect members to serve in the 96th United States Congress. They occurred in the middle of Democratic President Jimmy Carter's term, amidst an energy crisis and rapid inflation. The Democratic Party lost a net of 15 seats to the Republican Party, and thus lost their two-thirds supermajority, but still maintained a large 277-seat majority.

Overall results

Source: Election Statistics - Office of the Clerk

Special elections

Alabama

Alaska

Arizona

Arkansas

California

Colorado

Connecticut

Delaware

Florida

Georgia

Hawaii

Idaho

Illinois

Indiana

Iowa

Kansas

Kentucky

Louisiana

Maine

Maryland

Massachusetts

Michigan

Minnesota

Mississippi

Missouri

Montana

Nebraska

Nevada

New Hampshire

New Jersey

New Mexico

New York

North Carolina

North Dakota

Ohio

Oklahoma

Oregon

Pennsylvania

Rhode Island

South Carolina

South Dakota

Tennessee

Texas

Utah

Vermont

Virginia

Washington

West Virginia

Wisconsin 

|-
| 
| Les Aspin
|  | Democratic
| 1970
| Incumbent re-elected.
| nowrap | 

|-
| 
| Robert Kastenmeier
|  | Democratic
| 1958
| Incumbent re-elected.
| nowrap | 

|-
| 
| Alvin Baldus
|  | Democratic
| 1974
| Incumbent re-elected.
| nowrap | 

|-
| 
| Clement J. Zablocki
|  | Democratic
| 1948
| Incumbent re-elected.
| nowrap | 

|-
| 
| Henry S. Reuss
|  | Democratic
| 1954
| Incumbent re-elected.
| nowrap | 

|-
| 
| William A. Steiger
|  | Republican
| 1966
| Incumbent re-elected.
| nowrap | 

|-
| 
| Dave Obey
|  | Democratic
| 1969 
| Incumbent re-elected.
| nowrap | 

|-
| 
| Robert John Cornell
|  | Democratic
| 1974
|  | Incumbent lost re-election.New member elected.Republican gain.
| nowrap | 

|-
| 
| Bob Kasten
|  | Republican
| 1974
|  | Incumbent retired to run for Governor of Wisconsin.New member elected.Republican hold.
| nowrap | 

|}

Wyoming

See also
 1978 United States elections
 1978 United States gubernatorial elections
 1978 United States Senate elections
 95th United States Congress
 96th United States Congress

Notes

References